The Uhrenmuseum zum Rösli is a small horological museum in Zurich, Switzerland that was founded in 2006.

The museum is open by appointment and located in a historic building on Röslistrasse 46, about 3 kilometers north of the city center on the route to Oerlikon (Take Streetcar no. 7 to stop Röslistrasse).

Collection

The collection focusses on clocks although there are a few watches as well.  It is particularly rich in rustic clocks of Switzerland, mostly with wooden movements, and forged iron clocks of the Gothic period.  There is a good collection of Renaissance timepieces and of Neuchatel type pendules as well.  Altogether several hundred clocks are displayed.

History
The building, constructed as a farmhouse in 1802, in 1856 became the local schoolhouse till 1887, when the teacher Johann Gisler bought it as his residence.  His son Heinrich Gisler was a lifelong passionate collector of clocks, a tradition carried on by Heinrich's daughter Martha Gisler. Martha later befriended another local clock enthusiast named Hans Neufeld.  The museum houses the clocks owned by the “Uhrenstiftung Martha Gisler & Hans Neufeld”.

See also
 Other local horological museum: Uhrenmuseum Beyer
 Horology

References

External links
 Official website

Horological museums in Switzerland
Museums in Zürich
Museums established in 2006
2006 establishments in Switzerland